Kohsar University Murree (commonly referred to as KUM), is a public university located in Murree, Punjab, Pakistan. It was established by Government of Punjab vide Kohsar University, Murree Act-2020.

The university is currently based in the buildings of Govt. Graduate College Murree (Boys), Govt. Graduate College for Women Murree, Punjab House Murree, Resource Centre Murree and in Murree Brewery.

Kohsar University Murree currently offers undergraduate, graduate, and postgraduate programs in various fields including Business Administration, Computer Science, Education, and Social Sciences. The academic year is divided into two semesters, with each semester lasting for approximately 16 weeks.

Faculties and departments 
Kohsar University currently offers admissions in following departments:
 Department of Botany
 Department of English
 Department of Mathematics
 Department of Political Science
 Department of Psychology
 Department of Sociology
 Department of Statistics
 Department of Urdu

References

External links
Official website

Public universities in Punjab, Pakistan
Universities and colleges in Murree
Public universities and colleges in Punjab, Pakistan
Murree
Murree District
Buildings and structures in Murree
Education in Murree
Educational institutions established in 2020
2020 establishments in Pakistan